The Handball events at the 1978 All-Africa Games were held in Algiers, Algeria on July 1978. The competition included for the first time the women's event.

Egypt delegation protest and withdraw from the tournament and all the games due to the incident football match between Libya and Egypt in the football tournament.

Qualified teams

Squads

Group stage
All times are local (UTC+1).

Group A

Group B
Madagascar progressed after Egypt withdrawal.

Knockout stage

Semifinals

Third place match

Final

Final standing

References

 
1978 All-Africa Games
1978
African Games
Handball